Atotoztli I was a Princess of Culhuacan.

Atotoztli was a daughter of King Coxcoxtli and sister of King Huehue Acamapichtli. Atotoztli married Opochtli Iztahuatzin and bore him a son called Acamapichtli after her brother. She lived with her son in Texcoco. Her son became the first Aztec emperor.

Atotoztli was an ancestor of many Aztec emperors — kings of Tenochtitlan.

Sources

Bibliography
 
 

Nahua nobility
Year of birth unknown
Year of death unknown
Indigenous Mexican women
Nobility of the Americas